Isola is a commune of the Alpes-Maritimes department in southeastern France.

The Alpine ski resort of Isola 2000 is located on the territory of the commune.

Geography

Climate

Isola has a subarctic climate (Köppen climate classification Dfc).

Population

International relations
Since April 2010, Isola has been officially twinned with Castiglione di Garfagnana.

See also
Communes of the Alpes-Maritimes department

References

Communes of Alpes-Maritimes
Alpes-Maritimes communes articles needing translation from French Wikipedia